The League of Extraordinary Gentlemen is the soundtrack from the 2003 film The League of Extraordinary Gentlemen, released by Varèse Sarabande on August 1, 2003. The music was composed by Trevor Jones and Joseph Shabalala, and performed by the London Symphony Orchestra (conducted by Geoffrey Alexander). The Ladysmith Black Mambazo choral group performed the songs "Kenya - Wait For Me" and "Son of Africa". The soundtrack was not released in stores in the United States, and was at first released only for iTunes. After this did not generate satisfactory sales, it was released by the Varèse Sarabande label for purchase online.

Track listing
 Dawn of a New Century
 Kenya - Wait for Me
 Task Requires Heroes
 Promenade by the Sea
 Nautilus - Sword of the Ocean
 The Game Is On
 Old Tiger
 Capturing Mr. Hyde
 Mina Harker's Secret
 Phantom's Lair
 Portrait of Dorian Gray
 Treachery
 Storming the Fortress
 May This New Century Be Yours
 Son of Africa

External links
 Varèse Sarabande entry
 SoundtrackINFO entry

Superhero film soundtracks
Ladysmith Black Mambazo albums
Soundtrack
2003 soundtrack albums
DC Comics film soundtracks